José Antonio Crespo Ortiz (born 24 June 1977 in Madrid) is a badminton player from Spain. Crespo started playing badminton when he was eight in Benalmádena under coached Antonio Lopez, and when he was nine, he won the local tournament in San Juan. In 1991, he competed in the national tournament in Gandia, and won the U-15 boys' doubles title with his partner Jose Luis Ortiz. He was the champion in the boys' doubles event at the U-19 Spanish Junior National Championships in 1994 and 1995. Crespo also won the National senior title 11 times from 2001 to 2008, 3 in the singles event, 6 in the men's doubles, and 2 in the men's doubles event. Crespo competed at the Athens 2004 Summer Olympics in the men's doubles event with partner Llopis. They were defeated in the round of 32 by Lee Dong-soo and Yoo Yong-sung of Korea. Throughout his career, he had been ranked 13 in the men's doubles event with Sergio Llopis in 2003, and ranked 15 in the mixed doubles with Dolores Marco in 2002. He has a Bachelor of Science degree in Sports and Physical Activity at the Technical University of Madrid.

Achievements

IBF World Grand Prix
The World Badminton Grand Prix sanctioned by International Badminton Federation (IBF) since 1983.

Men's doubles

BWF International Challenge/Series 
Men's singles

Men's doubles

Mixed doubles

 BWF International Challenge tournament
 BWF International Series tournament
 BWF Future Series tournament

Notes

References

External links 
 
 
 
 
 

1977 births
Living people
Sportspeople from Madrid
Spanish male badminton players
Olympic badminton players of Spain
Badminton players at the 2004 Summer Olympics